Next is an album by Soulive that was released on March 12, 2002. It was produced by Jeff Krasno.   
    
Next brought a new chapter into the history of Soulive, and it marked the first time that the band toured as a quartet (with saxophonist Sam Kininger). Next built upon the success of the previous year's release, Doin' Something, with heavy driving beats and harmonized melodies.  Next mirrored the great organ/guitar/sax era of the 60's, and built upon that 60's feel with reminiscent songs like "Tuesday Night's Squad" and "Alkime".  Next also depicted a substantial hip-hop influence with rappers like Black Thought, featured on "Clap!", and Talib Kweli, featured on "Bridge to 'Bama (Hi Tek Remix)".  Dave Matthews was also a guest on the track "Joyful Girl".

Track listing
"Tuesday Night's Squad"  – 7:23   
"Flurries"  – 5:55   
"Liquid"  – 6:38 
"Joyful Girl" (featuring Dave Matthews)  – 6:16   
"Kalen"  – 7:39   
"Clap!" (featuring Black Thought) – 5:21   
"Interlude"  – 1:10   
"Ne-Ne"  – 8:06   
"I Don't Know" (featuring Amel Larrieux) – 5:09   
"Whatever It Is"  – 4:30   
"Alkime"  – 7:01   
"E.D. Hambone"  – 5:05   
"Bridge to 'Bama (Hi Tek Remix)" (featuring Talib Kweli) – 4:36

2002 albums
Blue Note Records albums
Soulive albums